Ethereal Killer is the debut album of Hammerhead, released in 1993 through Amphetamine Reptile Records.

Critical reception
City Pages called the album an "unrelenting, rage-fueled debut." The Washington Post wrote: "Thump and squeal is essential to the trio's Ethereal Killer, but close listening reveals actual musicality; buried in the mix, guitarist Paul Sanders and bassist Paul Erickson occasionally trade vocals and even harmonize."

Track listing

Personnel 
Hammerhead
Paul Erickson – bass guitar, vocals
Jeff Mooridian Jr. – drums
Paul Sanders – guitar, vocals
Production and additional personnel
Chris Coyne – recording
Hammerhead – mixing
Kalal – cover art
Don Lewis – photography
David B. Livingstone – mixing, recording
Bob Pague – mixing and recording on "Tuffskins"
Jeff Sanders – mixing and recording on "Tuffskins"

References

External links 
 

1992 debut albums
Amphetamine Reptile Records albums
Hammerhead (band) albums